Michael Koppelman is an American record producer and recording engineer. He worked with the artist Prince from 1989 to 1992 on his albums Graffiti Bridge, Diamonds and Pearls and Love Symbol. He also recorded or produced records for Ingrid Chavez, Booker T. & the M.G.'s, Frente!, Basehead, and Moxy Früvous. His current music project is called Fire Good.

Michael, his brother Kurt Koppelman and friend Chuck Hermes founded the BBS Bitstream Underground in 1994. It eventually became an Internet Service Provider (ISP) in Minneapolis, Minnesota. 

Michael founded Clockwork Active Media Systems, a digital agency in Minneapolis, in 2002. He is still part owner and sits on its board.

Michael studied astronomy at the University of Minnesota and was featured in the PBS television documentary Seeing in the Dark. He is part of the Slacker Astronomy blog and podcast team.

After studying at the American Brewers Guild, Michael became a professional brewer at Lucid Brewing (now Inbound Brewing). He is currently the owner of Badger Hill Brewing in Shakopee, MN.

References

External links
 Michael Koppelman's Discography
 Michael Koppelman's website

American audio engineers
Living people
University of Minnesota alumni
Year of birth missing (living people)